Abdul Rahman bin Ayob (born 2 December 1964 in Johor Bahru, Johor) is a Malaysian admiral who serves as 18th Chief of Royal Malaysian Navy.

Early life
Abdul Rahman was born on 2 December 1964 in Johor Bahru, Johor.

Navy career
Abdul Rahman Ayob joined the Royal Malaysian Navy as an Officer Cadet on 2 July 1982, and was commissioned as a Sub Lieutenant on 13 June 1984.

Among the positions he had held throughout his service include Commander of the Submarine Force, Deputy Chief of Mission for the Mindanao International Observation Team, Commander of Naval Areas 2, and Commander of Eastern Fleet before being appointed as Deputy Chief of Navy in 2019.

Abdul Rahman was appointed as Chief of the Navy on 27 January 2023, following the retirement of his predecessor Mohd Reza Mohd Sany. He also the first Submariner appointed as Chief of Navy.

Honours
  :
  Officer of the Order of the Defender of the Realm (KMN) (2009)
  Companion of the Order of Loyalty to the Crown of Malaysia (JSM) (2015)
  Commander of the Order of Meritorious Service (PJN) – Datuk (2022)
  Malaysian Armed Forces :
  General Service Medal (PPA)
  Loyal Service Medal (PPS)
  Malaysian Service Medal (PJM)
  Officer of the Most Gallant Order of Military Service (KAT)
  Warrior of the Most Gallant Order of Military Service (PAT)
  Loyal Commander of the Most Gallant Order of Military Service (PSAT)
  :
  Companion Class II of the Exalted Order of Malacca (DPSM) – Datuk (2015)
  :
  Commander of the Order of Kinabalu (PGDK) – Datuk (2019)
  :
  Knight Commander of the Order of the Crown of Selangor (DPMS) – Dato’ (2019)

References

1964 births
Living people
Royal Malaysian Navy personnel
People from Johor
Officers of the Order of the Defender of the Realm
Companions of the Order of Loyalty to the Crown of Malaysia
Commanders of the Order of Meritorious Service
Knights Commander of the Order of the Crown of Selangor
Commanders of the Order of Kinabalu